Silesian Uprising Cross is a Polish military decoration, established in 1946, awarded to veterans of the Silesian Uprisings (1919-1921) and to members of Polish resistance in World War II active in Silesia. The order ceased to be given out in 1999.

References

Orders, decorations, and medals of Poland
Awards established in 1946
Silesian Uprisings